B. S. Yediyurappa formed his fourth ministry (Council of Ministers) in July 2019 in Karnataka, a state in South India, after the INC-Janata Dal (Secular) coalition government collapsed due to defections to the BJP.

The ministry had 33 ministers when dissolved, including the Chief Minister. Out of the 33 ministers including the Chief Minister, all belonged to the BJP.

Council of Ministers

	

|}

If any department is vacant for any length of time, it automatically comes under the charge of the Chief Minister.

District Wise break up

See also
 Karnataka Legislative Assembly
 2019 Karnataka resignation crisis

References

Cabinets established in 2019
2019 establishments in Karnataka
Yediyurappa 04
2021 disestablishments in India
Cabinets disestablished in 2019
Bharatiya Janata Party state ministries
2019 in Indian politics